Sahar Valadbeigi (born 22 June 1978) is an Iranian actress. She got famous when she participated in some of popular Mehran Modiri's soap operas in 90's and 2000's such as Pavarchin and Noghtechin. Her husband is Nima Fallah, an Iranian actor.

Selected filmography

Series
Dorehami
I'm just kidding
Armando
Dar Hashie
Ghore
Masire Enherafi
Ab Pariya
Rich and Poor (TV series)
Gomshodeh 
Mahe Asal
Char Khooneh
The Dots (TV series)
On Tiptoes
Dokhtaran 
Be Mesle Bahar
Salam Zendegi

Cinema
Mojarade 40 sale
Shahre Mosh ha 2
Yek Farari az bebgo
Shirin
Khale Soske
Age MItoni Mano Begir
Age Mitoni Mano Bekosh
Ghelghelak
Ezdevaj GHiabi

References

External links

Living people
1977 births
People from Tehran
Actresses from Tehran
Iranian film actresses
Iranian television actresses
20th-century Iranian actresses
21st-century Iranian actresses